Dorotea Zovko (born 28 December 1990), known professionally as Aklea Neon, is a travelling musician from Croatia, one woman band and eco-conscious activist.

Music career
Aklea Neon began her professional career as one of the vocalist in the Osijek-based vocal ensemble Brevis. Aklea's debut single "Da mi je" was released on 21 January 2019 through Aquarius Records.
On 23 December 2019, Aklea was announced as one of the 16 participants in Dora 2020, the national contest in Croatia to select the country's Eurovision Song Contest 2020 entry, with the song "Zovi ju mama". In the final, held on 29 February 2020, she came seventh in the televote and fourth in the jury vote, placing fourth with 23 points. On 17 January 2020, AKlea Neon was nominated for three Rock&Off Awards including Public's Choice and  Best New Artist. Through 2020 Aklea released two more singles, "Riba u kadi" and "Shika Shika", from her upcoming debut studio album. On 19 January 2021, Aklea Neon was announced as the winner in the Singer-songwriter of the Year category of Hrvatska radiotelevizija's Music Pub Awards. On 24 February 2022, Aklea released her debut studio album Dođi na joji. "Na dah" was released on the same day as the album's lead single.

Artistry

Influences
Aklea cites Erykah Badu and Kaya Project as her biggest musical influences. She has also been influenced by folk soul artists like Ibeyi and Fémina.

Musical style and songwriting
Aklea uses her life experiences she gained from traveling as an inspiration in her work.

Discography

Albums

Singles

Awards and nominations

Notes

References

External links

21st-century Croatian women singers
Living people
1990 births
People from Osijek